(born June 21, 1982) is a Japanese stunt performer and suit actor from Takarazuka, Hyōgo Prefecture affiliated with Japan Action Enterprises. He has been cast in many leading roles in the Super Sentai and Kamen Rider series, portraying a diverse range of characters. He has a child with his current wife. He is currently the action director of the Kamen Rider series, having taken up the role starting with Kamen Rider Zero-One

Stunt/Suit Actor Roles

Super Sentai Series
 Juken Sentai Gekiranger (2007–2008) - GekiChopper
 Juken Sentai Gekiranger vs. Boukenger (2008) - GekiChopper
 Engine Sentai Go-onger (2008–2009) - Go-on Gold
 Kishryu Sentai Ryusoulger (2019-2020) - Master Blue

Kamen Rider Series
Kamen Rider Ryuki (2002-2003) - Kamen Rider Odin
Kamen Rider Ryuki: Episode Final (2002) - Kamen Rider Ryuga
Kamen Rider 555 (2003–2004) - Dragon, Orphnoch, Arch Orphnoch
Kamen Rider 555: Paradise Lost (2003) - Orphnoch
Kamen Rider Blade (2004–2005) - Kamen Rider Leangle, Undead
Kamen Rider Hibiki (2005–2006) - Kamen Rider Todoroki
Kamen Rider Hibiki & The Seven Senki (2005) - Kamen Rider Todoroki
Kamen Rider Kabuto (2006–2007) - Kamen Rider Sasword, Scorpio Worm, Kamen Rider Dark Kabuto, Shadow Troopers
Kamen Rider Kabuto: God Speed Love (2006) - Kamen Rider Sasword, Kamen Rider TheBee
Kamen Rider Den-O (2006–2007) Imagin (19-24)
Kamen Rider Den-O: I'm Born! (2007) Imagin
Kamen Rider Kiva (2008–2009) - Fangire
Kamen Rider Den-O & Kiva: Climax Deka (2008) - Imagin
Kamen Rider Decade (2009) - Kamen Rider KickHopper, Kamen Rider Kaixa, Kamen Rider Ryuki, Kamen Rider Faiz, Kamen Rider Agito, Kamen Rider G3, Kamen Rider Exceed Gills, Kamen Rider Blade, Kamen Rider Sasword, Kamen Rider Den-O, Kamen Rider Decade (15, 18), Kamen Rider Kabuto, Kamen Rider TheBee, Kamen Rider Hibiki, Kamen Rider Todoroki, Kamen Rider Dark Kiva, Kamen Rider Lance, Kamen Rider Hercus、Kamen Rider Black RX/Robo Rider, Kamen Rider Amazon, Grongi, Beetle Fangire, Fangire, Undead, Orphnoch, Apollo Geist
Kamen Rider Decade: All Riders vs. Dai-Shocker (2009) - Kamen Rider 1, Kamen Rider Super-1, Kamen Rider Decade
Net Edition Kamen Rider Decade: All Riders Super Spin-off (2009) - Himself (Jun Watanabe/Child X) (Non-Suit Actor Role),<ref name="Net">Net Edition Kamen Rider Decade: All Riders Super Spin-off Episode 14: Which One! Jun Watanabe: The Identity of Child X?</ref> Kamen Rider TodorokiKamen Rider W (2009–2010) - Nasca Dopant, Weather Dopant, R Nasca Dopant, DopantsKamen Rider × Kamen Rider W & Decade: Movie War 2010 (2009) - Nasca Dopant, Dummy DopantKamen Rider W Forever: A to Z/The Gaia Memories of Fate (2010) - Kamen Rider Eternal, T2 Weather DopantKamen Rider OOO (2010–2011) - Kazari, YummyKamen Rider × Kamen Rider OOO & W Featuring Skull: Movie War Core (2010) - Kazari, Armored Warrior Inhumanoid, Kamen Rider DoubleOOO, Den-O, All Riders: Let's Go Kamen Riders (2011) - Kamen Rider New Den-O, Kikaider 01, Shocker Greeed, Mole ImaginKamen Rider W Returns: Kamen Rider Eternal (2011) - Kamen Rider EternalKamen Rider OOO Wonderful: The Shogun and the 21 Core Medals (2011) - KazariKamen Rider × Kamen Rider Fourze & OOO: Movie War Mega Max (2011) - Kamen Rider PoseidonKamen Rider Fourze (2011-2012) - Libra Zodiarts, Scorpion Zodiarts, Sagittarius ZodiartsKamen Rider × Super Sentai: Super Hero Taisen (2012) - Kamen Rider DecadeKamen Rider Fourze the Movie: Everyone, Space Is Here! (2012) - Libra Zodiarts, Black KnightKamen Rider Wizard (2012-2013) - Kamen Rider Beast, White Wizard, PhoenixKamen Rider × Kamen Rider Wizard & Fourze: Movie War Ultimatum (2012) - Kamen Rider Beast,  Sanagiman, Inazuman, PhoenixKamen Rider × Super Sentai × Space Sheriff: Super Hero Taisen Z (2013) - Kamen Rider BeastKamen Rider Wizard in Magic Land (2013) - Kamen Rider BeastKamen Rider Gaim (2013-2014) - Kamen Rider Zangetsu/Zangetsu Shin, Kamen Rider BravoKamen Rider × Kamen Rider Gaim & Wizard: The Fateful Sengoku Movie Battle (2013) - Kamen Rider Zangetsu, Kamen Rider BeastHeisei Riders vs. Shōwa Riders: Kamen Rider Taisen feat. Super Sentai (2014) - Kamen Rider Decade, Kamen Rider Double, Kamen Rider Zangetsu ShinKamen Rider Gaim: Great Soccer Battle! Golden Fruits Cup! (2014) - Kamen Rider Zangetsu ShinKamen Rider Drive (2014-2015) - Kamen Rider MachKamen Rider × Kamen Rider Drive & Gaim: Movie War Full Throttle (2014) - Kamen Rider Zangetsu/Zangetsu Shin, Kamen Rider MachKamen Rider Ghost (2015-2016) - Kamen Rider SpecterKamen Rider Ex-Aid (2016-2017) - Kamen Rider BraveKamen Rider Build (2017-2018) - Night Rogue, Kamen Rider Rogue

Chouseishin SeriesChouseishin Gransazer (2003-2004) Sazer Tragos

Non-suit Actor Roles
 Samurai Sentai Shinkenger'' (2009–2010) - Police officer

References

External links
Official Profile on Spysee 

Japanese male actors
1982 births
Living people
People from Hyōgo Prefecture
Actors from Hyōgo Prefecture
Japanese stunt performers